Yeovilton  is a village and former civil parish, now in the parish of Yeovilton and District, in Somerset, England,  east of Ilchester and  north of Yeovil, in South Somerset district. The parish had a population of 1,226 in the 2011 census, estimated at 1,418 in 2019. This includes Podimore (also known as Puddimore or Milton Podimore) and the hamlets of Speckington and Bridgehampton. The village includes RNAS Yeovilton (HMS Heron) and the associated Fleet Air Arm Museum.

History
Yeovilton is close to the route of the Fosse Way, a Roman road that linked Exeter (Isca Dumnoniorum) in South West England to Lincoln (Lindum Colonia) in the East Midlands, via Ilchester (Lindinis), Bath (Aquae Sulis), Cirencester (Corinium), Leicester (Ratae Corieltauvorum) and Newark-on-Trent. There is evidence of a Romano-British farmstead under what is now an airfield.

Between 899 and 925, an estate in Yeovilton was granted by King Edward and between 955 and 959 King Eadwig gave a further holding of five hides to Brihtric. The parish of Yeovilton was part of the hundred of Somerton, while Podimore was part of the Whitley Hundred.

In 1411 the lord of the manor was John Rogers, who also held the manor of Barwick. By 1602, these had been inherited by Henry Lyte. The holding was purchased by G. D. W. Digby of Sherborne Castle in Dorset in 1857 and remained with the Digby family until 1919.

In 1939, the village was chosen as the site for the RNAS Yeovilton air base, which was used for engagements during World War II. The associated Fleet Air Arm Museum, an aircraft museum, was opened on the site of the airfield in 1964. Since 1993 the Fleet Air Arm’s Memorial Church has been the Church of St Bartholomew in Yeovilton. The village was host to a stage start of the Tour of Britain in 2007.

Governance
The parish council has responsibility for local issues, including setting an annual precept (local rate) to cover the council's operating costs and producing annual accounts for public scrutiny. The parish council evaluates local planning applications and works with the local police, district council officers, and neighbourhood watch groups on matters of crime, security, and traffic. The parish council's role also includes initiating projects for the maintenance and repair of parish facilities, as well as consulting with the district council on the maintenance, repair, and improvement of highways, drainage, footpaths, public transport, and street cleaning. Conservation matters (including trees and listed buildings) and environmental issues are also the responsibility of the council.

The village falls within the Non-metropolitan district of South Somerset, which was formed on 1 April 1974 under the Local Government Act 1972, having previously been part of Yeovil Rural District. Like other district councils, it is responsible for local planning and building control, local roads, council housing, environmental health, markets and fairs, refuse collection and recycling, cemeteries and crematoria, leisure services, parks and tourism.

Somerset County Council runs the largest and most expensive local services such as education, social services, libraries, main roads, public transport, policing and fire services, trading standards, waste disposal and strategic planning.

The village is part of the Yeovil county constituency represented in the House of Commons of the Parliament of the United Kingdom. It elects one Member of Parliament (MP) by the first past the post system of election.

On 1 March 2022 the parish was merged with Limington to form "Yeovilton and District".

Geography and climate
It lies on the north bank of the River Yeo, from which it gets its name, opposite Limington.

Average maximum and minimum temperatures, average rainfall, rain days and sunshine recorded in 1981–2010 at the Yeovilton Met Office weather station:

Transport
The village lies south of the A303 trunk road between Basingstoke in Hampshire and Honiton in Devon. Buses to and from Tiverton run twice a day. There is also a daily coach service on the Tiverton–London route. The nearest railway station is Yeovil Junction (9 miles, 14 km).

Religious sites
At Podimore the Church of Saint Peter dates from the 14th century and has been designated by English Heritage as a grade I listed building.

The Church of St Bartholomew in Yeovilton dates from around 1300 century and is a grade II* listed building. From 1642 Richard Sterne held the rectory of Yeovilton before going on to become Archbishop of York. The rector between 1762 and 1805 was Daniel Dumaresq after his period as an educational consultant to Russian and Polish monarchs.  Since 1993 the church has been owned by the Royal Navy, and it serves as the Memorial chapel for the Fleet Air Arm.

Notable people
Robert Potter (1721–1804), a cleric born in Podimore, was the first to translate the works of Aeschylus into English.

References

External links

Villages in South Somerset
Former civil parishes in Somerset